The New Jersey Democratic State Committee (NJDSC) is the affiliate of the Democratic Party in the U.S. state of New Jersey. LeRoy J. Jones Jr. is the chair and Peg Schaffer is the vice chair.

Structure
The NJDSC has a 13-member executive committee. The party also has a county chair for each of the state's 21 counties.

Current elected officials
The New Jersey Democratic Party holds a majority in the New Jersey Senate and the New Jersey General Assembly. The party also holds both U.S. Senate seats, 10 of the state's 12 U.S. House seats, and the governor's and lieutenant governor's offices.

Members of Congress

U.S. Senate
Democrats have controlled both of New Jersey's seats in the U.S. Senate since 2013:

U.S. House of Representatives
Out of the 12 seats New Jersey is apportioned in the U.S. House of Representatives, 9 are held by Democrats:

Statewide officials
Democrats control both of the elected statewide offices:

State legislative leaders
 President of the Senate: Nicholas Scutari
 Majority Leader: Teresa Ruiz
 President Pro Tempore: Sandra Bolden Cunningham
 Deputy Majority Leader: Paul Sarlo
 Speaker of the Assembly: Craig Coughlin
 Majority Leader: Louis Greenwald
 Speaker Pro Tempore: Benjie E. Wimberly

State Representatives

New Jersey Senate

New Jersey Assembly

List of chairmen and chairwomen

 James R. Nugent (1908–1911)
 Edward Everett Grosscup (1911–1919)
 Charles F. McDonald (1919–1922)
 Harry Heher (1922–1932)
 Mary Teresa Norton (1932–1935)
 William H. Kelly (1935–1938)
 David Theodore Wilentz (1938)
 Crawford Jamieson (1939)
 Mary Teresa Norton (1940–1944)
 Edward J. Hart (1944–1953)
 Charles R. Howell (1953–1954)
 George E. Brunner (1954–1961)
 Thorn Lord (1961–1965)
 Robert J. Burkhardt (1965–1969)
 Salvatore A. Bontempo (1969–1973)
 James P. Dugan (1973–1977)
 Richard J. Coffee (1977–1981)
 James F. Maloney (1981–1985) 
 Raymond M. Durkin (1985–1990)
 Philip M. Keegan (1990–1992)
 Raymond Lesniak (1992–1994)
 Tom Byrne (1994–1997)
 Thomas P. Giblin (1997–2001)
 Joseph J. Roberts (2001–2002)
 Bonnie Watson Coleman (2002–2006)
 Joseph Cryan (2006–2010)
 John Wisniewski (2010–2013)
 John Currie (2013–2021)
 LeRoy J. Jones, Jr. (2021–present)

References

External links
New Jersey Democratic State Committee

 
Democratic Party (United States) by state
Democratic State Committee